The fourth season of the Tyler Perry's House of Payne began airing on November 4, 2009, and concluded on January 5, 2011. It stars LaVan Davis as Curtis Payne, Cassi Davis as Ella Payne, Allen Payne as CJ Payne, Lance Gross as Calvin Payne, Demetria McKinney as Janine Payne and Keshia Knight Pulliam as Miranda Payne. Larramie "Doc" Shaw, who play as Malik Payne, appears infrequently this season due to scheduling conflicts with two other shows he starred in, The Suite Life on Deck and Pair of Kings. This season also features the return of China Anne McClain as Jazmine Payne and Denise Burse as Claretha Jenkins, and consists of 46 episodes. This season uses film lookout throughout the all episodes.

Episodes

LaVan Davis appeared in all the episodes.
Cassi Davis was absent for four  episodes.
Allen Payne was absent for twelve episodes.
Demetria McKinney was absent for fourteen episodes.
Lance Gross was absent for fifteen episodes.
Keshia Knight Pulliam was absent for nineteen episodes.
China Anne McClain was absent for twenty-four episodes.
Larramie "Doc" Shaw was absent for thirty-five episodes.
Denise Burse was absent for thirty-six episodes.

Tyler Perry's House of Payne seasons
2009 American television seasons
2010 American television seasons
2011 American television seasons